Ayana D’Nay Walker (born September 10, 1979) is an American former women's basketball player. She played for the Louisiana Tech Lady Techsters basketball team from 1998 to 2002. Walker was a member of gold-medal winning USA Basketball Women’s National Team in 2001 and set a USA single-game record with 19 rebounds in gold-medal game. She was also a member of gold-medal winning USA Basketball World University Games Team in 2001. Walker was drafted as the 20th overall pick by the Detroit Shock in the 2002 WNBA Draft. As a member of the Shock, she won the 2003 WNBA Championship. On July 3, 2005, Walker signed with the Charlotte Sting. After the Sting franchise folded, Walker was drafted by Los Angeles Sparks as the 12th pick in the dispersal draft on January 8, 2007. She returned to Detroit for her final season in 2007.

Louisiana Tech statistics 

Source

USA Basketball

Walker played on the team presenting the USA at the 1999 World University Games held in Palma de Mallorca, Spain. The team had a 4–2 record and earned the silver medal. Walker averaged 4.3 points per game and led the team in blocks, with nine.

Walker was selected to be a member of the team representing the USA at the 2001 World University Games held in Beijing, China. After winning the opening game easily, the USA team faced Canada and lost a close game 68–67. The USA team defeated Japan to earn a spot in the quarterfinals. The USA team fell behind by 12 points against undefeated Russia, but came back to win the game by eleven points. The next game was against the unbeaten host team China, and the USA team won 89–78. The USA team won their next two games to set up the gold medal game; a rematch against the host team. China would stay close early, but the USA team prevailed and won the gold medal with a score of 87–67. Walker set a USA World University Games record for most rebounds in a game with 19. She was the leading scorer and rebounding for the team, averaging 15.4 points and 8.6 rebounds per game.

References

https://web.archive.org/web/20121022063734/http://www.wnba.com/playerfile/ayana_walker/bio.html

1979 births
Living people
African-American basketball players
American expatriate basketball people in France
American women's basketball players
Basketball players from Houston
Charlotte Sting players
Detroit Shock players
Louisiana Tech Lady Techsters basketball players
Tarbes Gespe Bigorre players
Universiade gold medalists for the United States
Universiade silver medalists for the United States
Universiade medalists in basketball
Forwards (basketball)
Medalists at the 1999 Summer Universiade
Medalists at the 2001 Summer Universiade
21st-century African-American sportspeople
21st-century African-American women
20th-century African-American sportspeople
20th-century African-American women